Santa Rosa Dam (National ID # NM00158) is a dam in Guadalupe County, New Mexico.

The earthen dam was constructed by the United States Army Corps of Engineers, with a height of 214 feet and 1900 feet long at its crest.  The uppermost major dam along the Pecos River, it serves for irrigation water storage and flood control. Originally proposed in 1951 and authorized in 1954, the dam (then known as the Los Esteros project) generated controversy, as the Fort Sumner Irrigation District which depended on the Pecos River contended it would increase evaporation rates. It was not until 1971 when an agreement was reached to reduce the permanent storage pool at Los Esteros. Construction lasted from 1974 to 1979, and the name of the dam and lake were changed to Santa Rosa the following year.

The reservoir it creates, Santa Rosa Lake, has a normal water surface area of 26 square miles, a maximum capacity of 717,000 acre-feet, and a normal capacity of 200,000 acre-feet.  Recreation includes fishing (for largemouth bass, catfish and walleye), boating, camping, and other activities at the adjacent Santa Rosa Lake State Park.

References 

Dams in New Mexico
Reservoirs in New Mexico
United States Army Corps of Engineers dams
Dams completed in 1979
Buildings and structures in Guadalupe County, New Mexico
Dams on the Pecos River
Bodies of water of Guadalupe County, New Mexico
1979 establishments in New Mexico